Rachana is a 1983 Indian Malayalam film, directed by Mohan and produced by Sivan Kunnampilly. The film stars Srividya, Nedumudi Venu, Bharath Gopi and Mammootty in the lead roles. The film has musical score by M. B. Sreenivasan. Bharath Gopi won the Kerala State Film Award for Best Actor and the Kerala Film Critics’ Award for Best Actor for his performance in the film. Srividya won the Kerala State Film award for Best Actress for her performance in the same movie.

Cast
Srividya as Sarada
Nedumudi Venu as Achyuthanunni
Bharath Gopi as Sreeprasad
Mammootty as Gopi
Jagathy Sreekumar as Thomas
Vijay Menon as Rajan
Poornima Jayaram as Thulasi
Thrissur Elsy as Thomas's wife

Soundtrack
The music was composed by M. B. Sreenivasan and the lyrics were written by Mullanezhi.

Awards
Kerala State Film Awards

 Kerala State Film Award for Best Actor - Bharat Gopy
 Kerala State Film award for Best Actress - Srividya

Kerala Film Critics’ Award

 Best Actor – Bharat Gopy

References

External links
 
 rachana

1983 films
1980s Malayalam-language films